Founded in 1963, Palo Alto Chinese School (PACS) is located in Palo Alto, California and is the oldest Chinese school in the San Francisco Bay Area.  The school was formed with a merger between a Cantonese school and a Mandarin school.  The history of the Cantonese school could be traced back to 1960, when the Santa Clara Overseas Chinese School was founded.

School hours are 7:00PM–9:00PM on Friday nights at Jane Lathrop Stanford Middle School, 480 E. Meadow Dr, Palo Alto, from late August to early June. Annual tuition is $320 (new student and late register are $340).

Mandarin Classes are from K thru 12th grades and ages from 5–18 years old. In higher grades, classes provide instruction in conversation, writing and culture. Cantonese classes are C1–C9 grades and ages from 5–18 years old.

Cantonese classes are in 4 levels, roughly C1–2, C3–5, C6–8 and C9+ grades. Presently, in C3–4, Cantonese is taught in both Cantonese and English; in C8–9, both Cantonese and Pinyin Chinese are being taught. Cantonese classes are smaller; the curriculum and textbooks are designed to customize to the existing students. New students will be evaluated to the appropriate class levels.

Palo Alto Chinese School is a member of the Association of Northern California Chinese Schools (ANCCS).

See also
 History of the Chinese Americans in San Francisco

References

External links
 Palo Alto Chinese School (PACS)

Chinese-American culture in California
Private schools in California
Educational institutions established in 1963
Schools in Santa Clara County, California
1963 establishments in California
Buildings and structures in Palo Alto, California